Chak Mirza is a town and union council in the Islamabad Capital Territory of Pakistan. It is located at 33° 25' 50N 73° 25' 40E with an altitude of 547 metres (1797 feet). The village of Chak Mirza has a population of around 500 which has risen to as high as 1000 in the summer when mostly British Pakistanis go there on holiday.

References 

Union councils of Islamabad Capital Territory